
Year 491 BC was a year of the pre-Julian Roman calendar. At the time, it was known as the Year of the Consulship of Augurinus and Atratinus (or, less frequently, year 263 Ab urbe condita). The denomination 491 BC for this year has been used since the early medieval period, when the Anno Domini calendar era became the prevalent method in Europe for naming years.

Events 
 By place 
 Greece 
 Darius I sends envoys to all Greek cities, demanding "earth and water for vassalage" which Athens and Sparta refuse.
 The Greek city of Aegina, fearing the loss of trade, submits to Persia. The Spartan king, Cleomenes I tries to punish Aegina for its submission to the Persians, but the other Spartan king, Demaratus, thwarts him.
 Cleomenes I engineers the deposing of Spartan co-ruler Demaratus (and his replacement by Cleomenes’ cousin Leotychidas) by bribing the oracle at Delphi to announce that this action was divine will. The two Spartan kings successfully capture the Persian collaborators in Aegina.

 Sicily 
 Hippocrates, tyrant of Gela, loses his life in a battle against the Siculi, the native Sicilian people. He is succeeded as Tyrant of Gela by Gelo, who had been his commander of cavalry.

 Roman Republic 
 During this year there was a famine in Rome. General Gais Marcius Coriolanus suggested that people should not receive grains unless they agree to abolish the Office of Tribune. Because of this, the Tribunes had him exiled. In response, Coriolanus takes refuge with the leader of the Volsci, eventually leading the Volscian army in a war against Rome. It was only due to entreaties from his mother and wife that he abandoned his war against Rome.
 On the Via Latina, a main road leading out of Rome, the Temple of Fortuna Muliebras was finished.

 By topic 
 Art 
 The construction of a relief begins in the Apadana, a ceremonial complex at Persepolis. The relief pictures Darius I and Xerxes I receiving tribute and is now displayed in the Oriental Institute of the University of Chicago.

Deaths 
 Hippocrates, tyrant of Gela

References